Param Vir Chakra (PVC) is India 's highest military decoration

Param Vir Chakra also may refer to:

 Param Vir Chakra (film), a 1995 Bollywood war action film
 Parama Veera Chakra, a 2011 Telugu film
 Param Vir Chakra (TV series), a 1988 Indian TV serial on Param Vir Chakra winners

See also
 Param Vir, Indian-born British composer
Parama Veera Chakra, a 2011 film